George Talbot (1761 – 1850) was an English cricketer.  He was an early Marylebone Cricket Club (MCC) member who had previously been elected a Hambledon Club member in 1788.  He played in 23 recorded matches from 1785 to 1791 and was a useful batsman.

In HCC, he is mentioned in connection with "some quaint wagers" in the betting book at White's Club.  A member of the military, he eventually succeeded to his family title as 3rd Baronet.

References 
 Fresh Light on 18th Century Cricket by G B Buckley (FL18)
 Hambledon Cricket Chronicle by F S Ashley-Cooper (HCC)
 Scores & Biographies, Volume 1 by Arthur Haygarth (SBnnn)
 The Dawn of Cricket by H T Waghorn (WDC)

English cricketers
Hampshire cricketers
English cricketers of 1701 to 1786
English cricketers of 1787 to 1825
1761 births
1850 deaths
Kent cricketers
Surrey cricketers
Marylebone Cricket Club cricketers
White Conduit Club cricketers
Gentlemen of England cricketers